New Woman may refer to:

 New Woman, a feminist ideal emerging in the late 19th century
 The New Woman, a novel written by the Polish writer Bolesław Prus
 New Woman (magazine),  an Indian lifestyle magazine